= Illegal immigration to Angola =

Illegal immigration to Angola has been an issue in the country for many years. The Angolan government has cracked down on illegal immigration with deportations. There have been widespread allegations of abuses, including arbitrary detention, rape and beatings. It has been noted that many border crossings from the DRC may be in order to visit family or to engage in religious or cultural events since the DRC-Angola border divides certain clans and ethnic groups. In addition, illegal immigrants have been victims of human trafficking.
